Special Olympics Kosovo is a sporting organisation for children and adults with intellectual disabilities that operates in Kosovo. It is part of the global Special Olympics movement.

History
Special Olympics Kosovo was founded in 2002. Athletes from Kosovo first took part in the 2003 Special Olympics World Summer Games held in Dublin. This was the first time a team represented Kosovo at an international multisport event. Kosovo has participated in every Special Olympics World Summer Games since 2003 and Special Olympics World Winter Games since 2013.

Their first successful participation came at the 2019 Special Olympics in Abu Dhabi. In which the Kosovan delegation won three medals.
Sheqir Vllasaliu won gold in athletics at the 200m run. While the other two remaining bronze medals where won , by athlete Ibish Zogaj.

Official sports
Special Olympics Kosovo offers programs in the following sports:

Summer
Athletics
Basketball
Bocce
Boccia
Rhythmic Gymnastics

Winter
Alpine Skiing

Kosovo at the Special Olympics World Games

Athletes representing Kosovo have participated in the Special Olympics World Games since 2003.
Kosovo most recently participated in Abu Dhabi 2019. So far Kosovo won three medals, one of which is Gold and two of them being Bronze. All medals where won by male athletes, in the sport of Athletics.

Summer

Source:

Winter

Source:

See also
 Sport in Kosovo
 Membership of Kosovo in international sports federations

References

External links
 Official website
 Kosovo profile at the Special Olympics official website

Sports governing bodies in Kosovo
Kosovo at multi-sport events
Special Olympics
Parasports organizations